HNLMS Zeeland (D809) was a destroyer of the . The ship was in service with the Royal Netherlands Navy from 1955 to 1979. The destroyer was named after the Dutch province of Zeeland and was the twenty-first ship with this name. In 1978 the ship was taken out of service and later broken up and scrapped. The ship's radio call sign was "PAAU".

History
HNLMS Zeeland was one of four s and was built at the Koninklijke Maatschappij de Schelde (KMS) in Vlissingen. The keel laying took place on 12 January 1951 and the launching on 27 June 1953. The ship was put into service on 1 March 1955.

Portsmouth was visited after making a trip to the North Sea and English Channel in 1955. In 1956 she would participate in the NATO exercises Grande Chase and Cut Lose.

In July 1956 Zeeland, the destroyer  and the cruiser  visited Leningrad for the first time since 1914. Where they were officially welcomed at the harbor of Kronstadt by the Soviet authorities.

The ship was kept in reserve and laid up from 1956 until 1965.
She would participate in the NATO exercises Silent Rain in 1966 and Perfect Play in 1967. In 1968 she participated in the exercise Silver Tower and joined STANAVFORLANT. The next year she participated in the exercises Razor Sharp and Peace Keeper. 

In 1976 Zeeland, together with the frigates  visited New York to attend a fleet review held on the Hudson river.

In July 1976 Zeeland, together with the frigates Tromp, the destroyer , the submarine  and the replenishment ship  visited New York in commemoration of the city's 200 years anniversary.

On 29 September 1979 the vessel was decommissioned and struck from the register on 1 January 1979. Zeeland was sold on 8 November 1979 to the Dutch company Intershitra for scrapping.

Notes

Sources
 
 
 Also published as:

External links
 Hr. Ms. Zeeland - de onderzeebootjager D 809

Holland-class destroyers
1953 ships
Ships built in Vlissingen
Destroyers of the Cold War